United Left La Rioja (IU–La Rioja) is the regional branch of United Left (a political coalition that was organised in 1986) in the autonomous community of La Rioja.

References

Notes

La Rioja